Melhem Bechara Maalouf (19371996) was a Lebanese judge. Born in 1937, he started his judicial career as a prosecutor then became a judge at the jdeïdé court and was later appointed president of the first instance commercial court.

Maalouf ended his career as the president of the criminal chamber of the Court of cassation. He died in 1996 at age 59.

References

Lebanese judges
1937 births
1996 deaths
Place of birth missing
Appellate court judges